Kalateh-ye Baluch (also Romanized as Kalāteh-ye Balūch and Kalateh Balooch; also known as Kalāt-e Balūch and Kalāteh-ye Rokh) is a village in Gazik Rural District, Gazik District, Darmian County, South Khorasan Province, Iran. At the 2006 census, its population was 53, in 11 families.

References 

Populated places in Darmian County